Santa Maria in Piazza may refer to:

 Santa Maria in Piazza, Loro Piceno, a church in Loro Piceno, Marche, Italy
 Santa Maria in Piazza, Mogliano, a church in Mogliano, Marche, Italy

See also 

 Santa Maria a Piazza
 Santa Maria di Piazza (disambiguation)